The third season of Ich bin ein Star – Holt mich hier raus! aired from 11 to 26 January 2008.

Production
First rumors about a return of the show began to spread in 2007. However, RTL Television's entertainment manager, Tom Sänger, denied any plans on a third season because the return to a normal program schedule after the show's end would be difficult to accept for both the television channel and the viewers.

In early November 2007, it was reported that fashion designer Barbara Herzsprung chose to join a group of celebrities that were to visit the Australian rainforest in January 2008. But it was not until 20 November 2007, that RTL Television officially announced the show's return on 11 January 2008.

Contestants
On 19 January, contestant Lisa Bund had to leave the show and was hospitalized because of an acute gastritis which may have been caused by bad hygiene in the camp or during the trials.

On 22 January, DJ Tomekk was evicted from the show. A video which was recorded shortly before the beginning of the show shows him making a Hitler salute and singing "Deutschland über Alles". He insisted he was only joking yet was not allowed to return.

In the last show, on 26 January, the three remaining candidates were Bata Illic, Michaela Schaffrath, and Ross Antony; the latter was chosen by the viewers as this season's "King of the Jungle".

Bushtucker Trials

Total number of Bushtucker Trials done by each participant to date:

References 

2008 German television seasons
03